Live in San Francisco '16 is a live album by Australian psychedelic rock band King Gizzard & the Lizard Wizard.  The album was released on double vinyl and digital via Bandcamp on 20 November 2020. An accompanying concert film was also released, which premiered on Vimeo on 18 November 2020, and was later released on YouTube.

Information
The album features a set by the band performed at The Independent on May 25, 2016, in San Francisco, California, US.

Track listing
All songs written by Stu Mackenzie. Vinyl releases have tracks 1–5 on Side A, tracks 6–10 on Side B, tracks 11-12 on Side C and track 13 on Side D.

Personnel 

Michael Cavanagh – drums
Cook Craig – guitar, synthesizer
Ambrose Kenny-Smith – harmonica, vocals, organ
Stu Mackenzie – vocals, guitar, flute, mixing, producer
Eric Moore – drums
Lucas Harwood - bass
Joey Walker – guitar, vocals

Additional personnel
 Terry Yerves – live recording
 Marco Martin – live recording
 John Karr – live recording
 Jason Galea – layout editor
 Joeseph Carra - mastering
 Ben Butcher - photography
 Jamie Wdziekonski - photography

Charts

References

2020 live albums
King Gizzard & the Lizard Wizard live albums
ATO Records live albums